The 1995 Monmouth Hawks football team represented Monmouth University in the 1995 NCAA Division I-AA football season. This year was the team's final season as an NCAA Division I-AA independent program before transitioning to being a member of the Northeast Conference (NEC). The Hawks were led by third-year head coach Kevin Callahan and played their home games at Kessler Field. They finished the season with a record of 7–3.

Schedule

References

Monmouth
Monmouth Hawks football seasons
Monmouth Hawks football